213 (pronounced "Two One Three") was an American hip hop trio supergroup from Long Beach, California composed of Snoop Dogg, Warren G and Nate Dogg.  The name derives from Los Angeles' original telephone area code 213, which served the city of Long Beach at the time of the group's formation (it later became area code 562).

Background 
Their breakthrough song was the minor hit "Ain't No Fun (If the Homies Can't Have None)" from Snoop Dogg's solo debut Doggystyle, which also featured Kurupt of Tha Dogg Pound. In 1994, they released the St. Ides EP. Since then, they continued to collaborate on each other's solo projects, but they didn't release any new material as a group. They got their name from Oakland rap group 415 as paying homage. August 17, 2004, they released their only studio album The Hard Way, which reached #4 in the U.S. Billboard 200 charts. It featured the singles, "Groupie Luv" and "So Fly".

On March 15, 2011, Nate Dogg died in Long Beach, California, from complications of multiple strokes, effectively disbanding 213.

Discography

Albums

Video albums

Singles

Other charted songs

Guest appearances

Notes 
A  "Fly" did not enter the Billboard Hot 100, but peaked at number 2 on the Bubbling Under Hot 100 Singles chart, which acts as an extension to the Hot 100.
B  "Groupie Luv" did not enter the Billboard Hot 100, but peaked at number 6 on the Bubbling Under Hot 100 Singles chart, which acts as an extension to the Hot 100.
C  "Dolla Bill" did not enter the Billboard Hot R&B/Hip-Hop Songs, but peaked at number 11 on the Bubbling Under R&B/Hip-Hop chart, which acts as an extension to the Hot R&B/Hip-Hop Songs.

References 

Crips
Snoop Dogg
Hip hop groups from California
Hip hop supergroups
TVT Records artists
Musical groups from Los Angeles
Rappers from Los Angeles
Musical groups established in 1992
American musical trios
African-American musical groups
Gangsta rap groups
G-funk groups
1990 establishments in California